A carbon dioxide generator or CO2 generator is a machine used to enhance carbon dioxide levels in order to promote plant growth in greenhouses or other enclosed areas. Carbon dioxide generators have been used to help grow marijuana. They can be fueled with propane or natural gas. CO2 generators were used mostly by commercial growers until smaller and less expansive systems made the technology more widely available to hobbyists. The generators also give off heat. Using compressed CO2 is an alternative to generators.

See also

References

Horticulture
Industrial gases